Wolseley UK is a supplier of building materials, with trade customers (plumbers and builders) accounting for the largest proportion of its sales. It has retail showrooms around the United Kingdom which are open to the general public.

History
The Wolseley business began in 1887 making sheep shearing machinery, by Frederick York Wolseley. Herbert Austin, who had worked on Wolseley's shearing machinery development in Melbourne, Australia from 1887, when he was aged just 20, was appointed its manager and received a share of its equity.

Seeking other suitable products, Austin designed his first car in 1896, and for the next four years, continued to develop and improve his designs. Though the board did allow Austin to purchase some machinery to build cars, they decided around 1900, it was unlikely to be a profitable industry. In 1901, Wolseley's embryo car business was acquired by Vickers, Sons and Maxim.

The postwar rise of synthetic textiles sharply reduced the demand for wool and the necessary machinery, and in 1960, Wolseley diversified activities, by buying Nu Way Heating Limited. Nu Way Burners Limited was founded in 1932 in Vines Lane, Droitwich Spa, Oil Burner Components Limited was founded by Nu Way in 1959, as a national spares organisation. Out of that grew O.B.C. Limited, and then Wolseley Centers Limited, the major distributor of plumbing and central heating equipment. In 1965, Wolseley purchased Granville Controls and Yorkshire Heating Supplies.

Wolseley continued to expand buying both manufacturing and distribution businesses. In 1982, it entered the market in the United States by acquiring Ferguson Enterprises, a distributor of plumbing supplies, with around 50 branches on the East Coast of the United States. In 1984, some of the manufacturing businesses were sold off, and since that time Wolseley has been mainly a distribution business. The trading name of Plumb Center was acquired in the 1980s, and extended to include Build Center, Drain Center, and Hire Center.

The company's headquarters used to be in Ripon, Yorkshire, where it was the city's largest employer. In July 2004, the company announced that its head office was to be relocated to Leamington Spa, Warwickshire. A regional office, including the central human resources and information technology functions, remains in Ripon.

The company acquired several other companies, such as Broughton Crangrove, ENCON, and the highly successful Bathstore business, which was acquired by Wolseley Plc in June 2003, plus significant operations in France, Austria and Italy. In 2004, the company undertook a rebranding exercise, and its main outlets were known as Plumb Center, Build Center (acquired by Jewsons in July 2011), Pipe Center, Parts Center, Drain Center, Climate Center and Integrated Supply Chain (formerly Maintenance Center).

In 2010 Wolseley ended its participation in the hire industry, selling Brandon Hire for a £42m Loss. On July 13, 2011, it was announced that Wolseley was to sell off its Electric Center arm to rivals Edmundson Electrical.
 
With parent company Ferguson plc's ownership of similar operations in North America, Wolseley UK was part of one of the largest network of builders merchants in the world. This gave it advantages over competitors in terms of pricing and stock. Wolseley UK is no longer involved in manufacturing; instead, it focuses on distributing and selling bought in products.

In January 2021, Wolseley UK was sold by Ferguson to a private equity firm, Clayton, Dubilier & Rice, for £308m.

References

Companies based in Leamington Spa
Building materials companies of the United Kingdom
2021 mergers and acquisitions
Private equity portfolio companies